Granaglione  is a town in the comune of Alto Reno Terme, in the Metropolitan City of Bologna, central Italy. It was a separate comune until January 2016, when it merged with Porretta Terme into the new entity of Alto Reno Terme.
 

Cities and towns in Emilia-Romagna